The Dragon's Back Race (in Welsh, Ras Cefn y Ddraig) is a multi-day running race across mountains of Wales, from North Wales to South Wales. The 2019 race was from Conwy to Llandeilo, taking place over five days. The ascents in it would add up to twice the height of Mount Everest. The first race was in September 1992, and the second in September 2012. The name refers to the legendary Welsh Dragon.

History

In August 2020 the organisers, Ourea Events, released the news that the 2021 edition of the race would mark a step change in the evolution of the event with the addition of a sixth day, which would see the race finish at the iconic Cardiff Castle.

The winners have been as follows.

2021 Route
The distance was  covered in six days. The leg goes from Conwy Castle, Carneddau, Tryfan, Glyderau, Crib Goch ridge, Snowdon Horseshoe to Nant Gwynant. Day two,  with  vertical climb, routes via Cnicht, Moelwynion, Rhinogydd mountains. The third leg, length , goes from Dolgellau over Cadair Idris to the Cambrian Mountains.

References

Footnotes

Sources

External links
Official website
Dragon’s Back Race – Preparations Web site with images
Multiday races
Ultramarathons in the United Kingdom